Rezzago (Valassinese  ) is a comune (municipality) in the Province of Como in the Italian region Lombardy, located about  north of Milan and about  northeast of Como.

The municipality of Rezzago contains the frazione (subdivision) Enco.

Rezzago borders the following municipalities: Asso, Caglio, Caslino d'Erba.

Demography

Demographic evolution

Immigration 
– Demographic Stats

References

Cities and towns in Lombardy